Max B. Yasgur (December 15, 1919 – February 9, 1973) was an American farmer. He was the owner of the  dairy farm in Bethel, New York, where the Woodstock Music and Art Fair was held on August 15–18, 1969. He sold his farm in 1971 and retired to Florida, where he died in 1973.

Personal life and dairy farming
Yasgur was born in New York City to Russian Jewish immigrants Samuel and Bella Yasgur. He was raised with his brother Isidore (1926–2010) on the family's farm (where his parents also ran a small hotel) and attended New York University, studying real estate law. By the late 1960s, he was the largest milk producer in Sullivan County, New York. His farm had 650 cows, mostly Guernseys.

At the time of the festival in 1969, Yasgur was married to Miriam (Mimi) Gertrude Miller Yasgur (1920–2014) and had a son, Sam (1942–2016) and daughter, Lois (1944–1977). His son was an assistant district attorney in New York City at the time.

In later years, it was revealed that Yasgur was in fact a conservative Republican who supported the Vietnam War. Nevertheless, he felt that the Woodstock festival could help business at his farm and also tame the generation gap. Despite claims that he showed disapproval towards the treatment of the counterculture movement, this has not been confirmed. Woodstock promoter Michael Lang, who considered Yasgur to be his "hero," stated that Yasgur was "the antithesis" of what the Woodstock festival stood for. Yasgur's early death prevented him from answering questions about why the festival took place.

Woodstock Festival
Soon afterward he began to receive both threatening and supporting phone calls (which could not be placed without the assistance of an operator because the community of White Lake, New York, where the telephone exchange was located, still utilized manual switching). Some of the calls threatened to burn him out. However, the helpful calls outnumbered the threatening ones.
Opposition to the festival began soon after the festival's relocation to Bethel was announced. Signs were erected around town, saying, "Local People Speak Out Stop Max's Hippie Music Festival. No 150,000 hippies here" and "Buy no milk".

Yasgur was 49 at the time of the festival and had a heart condition. He said at the time that he never expected the festival to be so large, but that "if the generation gap is to be closed, we older people have to do more than we have done."

Yasgur quickly established a rapport with the concert-goers, providing food at cost or for free. When he heard that some local residents were reportedly selling water to people coming to the concert, he put up a big sign at his barn on New York State Route 17B reading "Free Water." The New York Times reported that Yasgur "slammed a work-hardened fist on the table and demanded of some friends, 'How can anyone ask money for water? His son Sam recalled his father telling his children to "take every empty milk bottle from the plant, fill them with water and give them to the kids, and give away all the milk and milk products we had at the dairy."

At the time of the concert, friends described Yasgur as an individualist who was motivated as much by his principles as by the money. According to Sam Yasgur, his father agreed to rent the field to the festival organizers because it was a very wet year, which curtailed hay production. The income from the rental would offset the cost of purchasing thousands of bales of hay.

Yasgur also believed strongly in freedom of expression, and was angered by the hostility of some townspeople toward "anti-war hippies". Hosting the festival became, for him, a "cause".

On the third day of the festival, just before Joe Cocker's early afternoon set, Yasgur addressed the crowd:

His speech was met with a massive cheer from the audience.

After Woodstock 

Several of the performers at the festival had arranged to send thank you gifts, flowers, and letters to Yasgur for allowing use of the farm.

Many of Yasgur's neighbors turned against him after the festival, and he was no longer welcome at the town general store, but he never regretted his decision to allow the concert on his farm. The local postmaster reportedly turned against the Yasgurs, so they opted to change their address from Bethel to Cochecton, another nearby town. On January 7, 1970, he was sued by his neighbors for property damage caused by the concert attendees. However, the damage to his own property was far more extensive and, over a year later, he received a $50,000 settlement to pay for the near-destruction of his dairy farm. He refused to rent out his farm for a 1970 revival of the festival, saying, "As far as I know, I'm going back to running a dairy farm".

In 1971, Yasgur sold the  farm, and moved to Marathon, Florida, where, a year and a half later, he died of a heart attack at the age of 53. He was given a full-page obituary in Rolling Stone magazine, one of the few non-musicians to have received such an honor.

In 1997, the site of the concert and  surrounding it was purchased by Alan Gerry for the purpose of creating the Bethel Woods Center for the Arts.

In popular culture
Joni Mitchell's song "Woodstock", made famous by Crosby, Stills, Nash & Young (also covered by Matthews Southern Comfort, Richie Havens, James Taylor, Eva Cassidy, Chelsea Wolfe, and Brooke Fraser), has a line about "going down to Yasgur's Farm".
Mountain (who were also at the concert) recorded a song shortly after the event entitled "For Yasgur's Farm".
The Beastie Boys 1989 album Paul's Boutique samples Yasgur's Woodstock speech on the track "Car Thief".
The progressive rock band Moon Safari has a song titled "Yasgur's Farm" on their album Blomljud.
Yasgur is portrayed by Eugene Levy in Ang Lee's film Taking Woodstock.

Sam Yasgur wrote a book about his father, Max B. Yasgur: The Woodstock Festival's Famous Farmer, in August 2009.

See also
Michael Eavis, British farmer who has hosted the Glastonbury Festival since 1970

References

External links
 Sullivan County Democrat: Those Who Shaped History
 
 "The Woodstock Story: Max Yasgur"

1919 births
1973 deaths
Dairy farmers
Farmers from New York (state)
20th-century American Jews
American people of Russian-Jewish descent
Businesspeople from New York City
New York (state) Republicans
20th-century American businesspeople
People from Bethel, New York
People from Marathon, Florida
Woodstock Festival
New York University alumni